Elliptio mcmichaeli, the fluted elephantear, is a species of freshwater mussel, an aquatic bivalve mollusk in the family Unionidae, the river mussels.

This species is endemic to the Escambia and Choctawhatchee River systems in the southeastern United States.  As of 2014, its NatureServe conservation status is "imperiled."

References

Molluscs of the United States
mcmichaeli
Molluscs described in 1956
Taxonomy articles created by Polbot